Udoypur Union is a union parishad of Mollahat Upazila, Bagerhat District in Khulna Division of Bangladesh. It has an area of 53.66 km2 (20.72 sq mi) and a population of 19,807.

References

Unions of Mollahat Upazila
Unions of Bagerhat District
Unions of Khulna Division